Albert Johnson (March 5, 1869 – January 17, 1957) was an American politician who served as the U.S. representative from Washington's third congressional district from 1915 to 1933.

Background
Born in Springfield, Illinois, Johnson attended the schools at Atchison, Kansas and Hiawatha, Kansas.

Career

Journalist
Johnson worked as a reporter on the St. Joseph (Missouri) Herald and the St. Louis Globe-Democrat from 1888 to 1891, as managing editor of the New Haven Register in 1896 and 1897, and as news editor of The Washington Post in 1898.

To edit the Tacoma News he moved to Tacoma, Washington in 1898. He became editor and publisher of Grays Harbor Washingtonian (Hoquiam, Washington) in 1907.

Representative
Albert Johnson was elected as a Republican to the Sixty-third and to the nine succeeding Congresses (March 4, 1913 – March 3, 1933), but was defeated in a bid for reelection in November 1932.

While a Member of Congress, Johnson was commissioned a captain in the Chemical Warfare Service during the First World War, receiving an honorable discharge on November 29, 1918.  He served as chairman of the Committee on Immigration and Naturalization (Sixty-sixth through Seventy-first Congresses), where he played an important role in the passage of the anti-immigrant legislation of the 1920s.

According to his critics, Johnson was "an outspoken anti-Semite, a Ku Klux Klan favorite, and an ardent opponent of immigration." Although it is unknown whether he was ever a member of the Klan, the KKK consistently supported his re-election for the purpose of advocating "restricted immigration laws." At the time of the first mass deportation of foreign-born anarchists and communists in the 20th century, on December 21, 1919, he was the chairman of the Immigration and Naturalization Committee. Johnson was one of the members of Congress who, along with the 24-year-old J. Edgar Hoover, newly appointed by Attorney General A. Mitchell Palmer as the head of the Department of Justice’s newly-created Radical Division, accompanied the deportees on the short boat trip across the harbor from Ellis Island to Brooklyn. There they would board an old troopship, The Buford, for their voyage back across the Atlantic to Europe. [from “Obstruction of Injustice,” by Adam Hochschild, “The New Yorker” magazine, November 11, 2019]

Johnson was the chief author of the Immigration Act of 1924 (known as the Johnson-Reed Act), which in 1927 he justified as a bulwark against "a stream of alien blood, with all its inherited misconceptions respecting the relationships of the governing power to the governed." Johnson has been described as "an unusually energetic and vehement racist and nativist."

Eugenicist

Johnson appointed one of the leading eugenicists of the era, Harry Laughlin, associated with the Eugenics Record Office in Cold Spring Harbor, New York, as the committee's Expert Eugenics Agent.
From 1923 to 1924, he was the president of the Eugenics Research Association, an organization of eugenics researchers and supporters which opposed interracial marriage and also supported the program of forced sterilization of the mentally disabled. In support of his 1919 proposal to suspend immigration he included this quote from a State Department official referring to the recent wave of Jewish immigrants as "filthy, un-American, and often dangerous in their habits."

Journalist
Johnson retired from the newspaper business in 1934.

Death

Albert Johnson died age 87 on January 17, 1957, in a veterans hospital at American Lake, Washington and was buried in Sunset Memorial Park, Hoquiam, Washington.

References

Sources
 Daniels, Roger.  Guarding the Golden Door: American Immigration Policy and Immigrants since 1882.  Boston & New York: Hill and Wang, 2004.
 Goings, Aaron. Johnson, Albert (1869–1957) - HistoryLink.org Essay 8721.

External links
 

1869 births
1957 deaths
20th-century American politicians
20th-century far-right politicians in the United States
American eugenicists
American white supremacists
Politicians from Springfield, Illinois
Politicians from Tacoma, Washington
St. Louis Globe-Democrat people
United States Army officers
Republican Party members of the United States House of Representatives from Washington (state)
Activists from Washington (state)
History of racism in Washington (state)
Military personnel from Illinois